An independence referendum was held in the Mongolian People's Republic on 20 October 1945. It was approved by 100% of voters, with no votes against, according to official statistics. Voter turnout was 98.5%.

Mongolia had gained de facto independence from the Republic of China in the Mongolian Revolution of 1921. In that year the last Chinese troops in Mongolia had been expelled by the White Russian general Roman von Ungern-Sternberg, prompting Soviet intervention. The Mongolian People's Republic was effectively an unrecognized satellite state of the Soviet Union (USSR). Towards the end of World War II, the USSR pushed China for formal recognition of the status quo, threatening to stir up Mongolian nationalism within China. In the Sino-Soviet Treaty of Friendship and Alliance signed on 14 August 1945, China agreed to recognize Mongolian independence after a successful referendum. The actual referendum was regarded by both sides as political theatre, due to the peculiarity of a supposed unanimous 100% vote in favour.

Results

See also

Modern Mongolian history
Outer Mongolia

References

Mongolia
Mongolia
Independence
Referendums in Mongolia
Mongolia